Busfest (known before 2012 as Vanfest) is a three-day annual festival held in early September at the Three Counties Showground in Malvern, Worcestershire, England, for owners of VW camper-vans—the Volkswagen Type 2 Transporter or "Bus". First held in 1994, it is an international festival, with a large contingency from Germany every year, and attendees from the Netherlands, France, Belgium, Sweden, USA and even Australia.

The festival is owned and produced by Vanfest Ltd and it is the largest VW Transporter festival in the world, attended by up to 9000 vans and 45,000 people. Simon Holloway owns the event and is Festival Coordinator; Neil Pickett is Festival Director. They are assisted by over 50 event professionals and 150 volunteers. Attendees camp in their vans at campsites within the showground, which is equipped with sanitation facilities. The festival, which is open to day visitors as well as campers, has over 350 trade stands, two arenas with fulltime entertainment schedules, a fun fair, FunZone, sideshows and displays, and walkabout entertainers.

There are several live music stages with evening entertainment for all ages, featuring various types of music. Recent bands who have appeared there include The X Factor Tour, Slade, Showaddywaddy, Dr & The Medics, The Drifters, Rockaoke, The Rubettes, The Commitments, Bad Manners, Right Said Fred,   Brotherhood Of Man, Karen Coleman, and the Edwin Starr Band. The HUB Stage is a "drop-in/drop-out" stage hosted by VDub Radio, who do a 24-hour Internet radio show from the stage studio, as well as 12 hours a day of live DJs, fun, competitions and giveaways. The Severn Stage is the main undercover stage, holding party nights with impressionists and tribute bands. The SheepShed Stage hosts rock, alternative and local bands, whilst the Chill Stage features laid-back beats and acoustic vibes; and the Dance Stage features techno, trance, dance and house music from top DJs.

References

External links

Auto shows
Malvern, Worcestershire
Volkswagen Group